Adrian Zingg (April 15, 1734, St.Gallen – May 26, 1816, Leipzig) was a Swiss painter.

Life
Adrian Zingg received his professional training with his father, the steel cutter Bartolomäus Zingg, then became an apprentice with the engraver . In 1757 he worked in Bern, painting vedute with Johann Ludwig Aberli. Together with the medalist Johann Caspar Mörikofer (1732–1790), he travelled to Paris in 1759, where Zingg worked for seven years with the engraver Johann Georg Wille.

In 1764 he was supported by Christian Ludwig von Hagedorn as an engraver at the newly founded Dresden Academy of Fine Arts, where he worked as a teacher from 1766.  He had an intensive relationship with professor Christian Wilhelm Ernst Dietrich, who acted as a mentor for Zingg.  In 1774, after the death of Dietrich, Zingg began to complete his late work and published a total of 87 sheets.

In 1769, he also became a member of the Vienna Academy and, in 1787, a member of the Prussian Academy of Arts. In 1803 he was appointed professor of copper etching at the Dresden Academy. Some of Zingg's famous students included  and his son Adrian Ludwig Richter, also Heinrich Theodor Wehle and Christoph Nathe.

References
This article was initially translated from the German Wikipedia

Further reading
 Johann Kaspar Fuessli: Geschichte der besten Künstler in der Schweitz. Vol.3. Orell, Zürich 1770, pp. 230–239.
 
 Sabine Weisheit-Possél: Adrian Zingg (1734–1816). Landschaftsgraphik zwischen Aufklärung und Romantik. LIT Verlag, Münster 2010, 
 Staatliche Kunstsammlungen Dresden, Kupferstich-Kabinett; Petra Kuhlmann-Hodick; Claudia Schnitzer; Bernhard von Waldkirch (Ed.): Adrian Zingg. Wegbereiter der Romantik. Sandstein Verlag, Dresden 2012,

External links

 
 Adrian Zingg. Wegbereiter der Romantik
 

1734 births
1816 deaths
People from St. Gallen (city)
Swiss Roman Catholics
18th-century Swiss painters
18th-century Swiss male artists
Swiss male painters
19th-century Swiss painters
19th-century German male artists
Academic staff of the Dresden Academy of Fine Arts
19th-century Swiss male artists